Morteza Bakhtiari (born 1952) is an Iranian politician who served as Minister of Justice from 2009 to 2013.

Early life
Bakhtiari was born in Mashhad in 1952.

Career

Bakhtiari served as the director of the state prisons organization of Iran from 4 March 1999 to June 2004.  He was named as the head of the justice department of the Khorasan Province in Mashhad in June 2004, replacing Ali Akbar Yasaqi. Then he began to serve as the governor of Isfahan in October 2005. He was approved by the Majlis as justice minister to the cabinet led by president Mahmoud Ahmedinejad on 3 September 2009 and replaced Gholam Hossein Elham as justice minister. Bakhtiari won 225 votes in favor and 36 votes against. 23 members of the Majlis did not attend the session.

Bakhtiari was one of seven members of the committee that was tasked with carrying out the presidential elections held in June 2013. His term as justice minister ended on 15 August 2013 and he was replaced by Mostafa Pourmohammadi.

Sanctions
The European Union put sanctions on Bakhtiari and other two ministers in the form of a visa ban and asset freeze in October 2011 due to alleged human rights abuses. The Treasury of the United Kingdom also put him among asset freeze targets in October 2011 due to the same reason.

References

External links

21st-century Iranian politicians
1952 births
Governors of Isfahan
Iranian wardens
Living people
Ministers of Justice of Iran
People from Mashhad